King Ali may refer to:
Ali ibn Yusuf (1084–1143), fifth Almoravid king
Ali Mughayat Syah (died 1530), first sultan of the Kingdom of Aceh Darussalam
Ali Shah Chak, king of Kashmir from 1570 to 1578
Ali of Hejaz (1879–1935), King of Hejaz and Grand Sharif of Mecca

 The king I.Ali of 11/B (2006-) king of 11/B,10/B,9/A library president

See also
Ali Raja, the title of the king of the Arakkal Kingdom (1545–1819)